Ministry of Transportation/Transport and Communications can refer to:
Ministry of Transport and Communication (Armenia)
Ministry of Infrastructure, Transport and Networks, formerly the Ministry of Transportation and Communications (Greece)
Ministry of Transport and Communications (Ethiopia)
Ministry of Transport and Communications (Finland)
Ministry of Transport and Communications (Norway)
Ministry of Transport and Communications (Kazakhstan)
Ministry of Transport and Communications (Myanmar)
Ministry of Transportation and Communications (Peru)
Ministry of Transportation and Communications (Republic of China)
Ministry of Transport and Communications (Venezuela)
Ministry of Transport and Communications (Zambia)